The 1950 Jersey Road Race was a Non-Championship Formula One motor race held on 9 July 1950 at the St. Helier Circuit, in Saint Helier, Jersey. It was the twelfth race of the 1950 Formula One season. The 55-lap race was won by Ferrari driver Peter Whitehead. Reg Parnell finished second in a Maserati, and Toulo de Graffenried third, also in a Maserati.

Results

References

chicanef1.com – 1950 Jersey Road Race
Race results are taken from and

Jersey Road Race
Sport in Jersey
Saint Helier
Road Race
Glover